An Act for the Gradual Abolition of Slavery, passed by the Fifth Pennsylvania General Assembly on 1 March 1780, prescribed an end for slavery in Pennsylvania. It was the first act abolishing slavery in the course of human history to be adopted by a democracy. The Act prohibited further importation of slaves into the state, required Pennsylvania slaveholders to annually register their slaves (with forfeiture for noncompliance, and manumission for the enslaved), and established that all children born in Pennsylvania were free persons regardless of the condition or race of their parents. Those enslaved in Pennsylvania before the 1780 law came into effect remained enslaved for life. Pennsylvania's "gradual abolition"—rather than Massachusetts's 1783 "instant abolition"—became a model for freeing slaves in other Northern states.

1780 Act
The 1780 Act prohibited further importation of slaves into Pennsylvania, but it also respected the property rights of Pennsylvania slaveholders by not freeing slaves already held in the state. It changed the legal status of future children born to enslaved Pennsylvania mothers from "slave" to "indentured servant", but required those children to work for the mother's master until age 28. To verify that no additional slaves were imported, the Act created a registry of all slaves in the state. Slaveholders who failed to register their slaves annually, or who did it improperly, lost their slaves to manumission.

The 1780 Act specifically exempted members of the U.S. Congress and their personal slaves. Congress was then the only branch of the federal government under the Articles of Confederation, and met in Philadelphia.

Members of the Fifth Pennsylvania General Assembly 

*member list incomplete / vote incomplete

Northumberland County 

 William Montgomery — "yes"

City of Philadelphia 

 George Bryan — "yes"
 William Hollingshead
 Jacob Schriener
 Michael Shubart
 Charles Wilson Peale

Philadelphia County 

 John Bayard
 Robert Knox
 Robert Lollar
 Joseph M'Clean
 Edward Heston — "yes"
 William Coats
 Daniel Hiester
 Samuel Mechlin
 Joseph Blewer

Bucks County 

 Gerardus Wynkoop II
 Benjamin Fell
 William Scott
 Arthur Watts
 Joseph Savage

Chester County 

 David Thomas
 Henry Hayes
 John Fulton
 James Boyd
 Patrick Anderson
 Joseph Park
 William Harris
 Sketchly Morton

Lancaster County 

 James Anderson
 John Smiley
 John Gilchreest
 Christopher Kucher
 James Cunningham
 William Brown Sr.
 Emanuel Carpenter, Jr.
 William Porter

Northampton County

York County

Cumberland County

Bedford County

Westmoreland County

1788 Amendment
An Amendment, created to explain and to close loopholes in the 1780 Act, was passed in the Pennsylvania legislature on 29 March 1788. The Amendment prohibited a Pennsylvania slaveholder from transporting a pregnant enslaved woman out-of-state so her child would be born enslaved; and from separating husbands from wives, and children from parents. It required a Pennsylvania slaveholder to register within six months the birth of a child to an enslaved mother. It prohibited all Pennsylvanians from participating in, building or equipping ships for, or providing material support to the slave trade.

The 1780 Act had allowed a non-resident slaveholder visiting Pennsylvania to hold slaves in the state for up to six months. But a loophole was soon identified and exploited: if the non-resident slaveholder took his slaves out of Pennsylvania before the 6-month deadline, even for one full day, it would void the residency of his slaves. The 1788 Amendment prohibited this rotation of slaves in and out-of-state to subvert Pennsylvania law.

Washington's dilemma
The 1780 Act had exempted personal slaves owned by members of Congress. By 1790, when Philadelphia became the temporary national capital for 10 years, there were three branches of the federal government under the US Constitution. There was confusion about whether or not the Pennsylvania law extended to all federal officials; members of Congress (legislative branch) remained exempt, but there was uncertainty regarding whether justices of the US Supreme Court (judicial branch) and the US President and the US Cabinet (executive branch) would also be exempt. Attorney General Edmund Randolph lost his personal slaves to manumission because of his misunderstanding of the state law. He conveyed his advice to President George Washington through the president's secretary, Tobias Lear:

This being the case, the Attorney General conceived, that after six months residence, your slaves would be upon no better footing than his. But he observed, that if, before the expiration of six months, they could, upon any pretense whatever, be carried or sent out of the State, but for a single day, a new era would commence on their return, from whence the six months must be dated for it requires an entire six months for them to claim that right.

Washington argued privately that his presence in Philadelphia was solely a consequence of the city being the temporary national capital, and that he remained a citizen of Virginia and subject to its laws on slavery. Still, he was careful not to spend six continuous months in Pennsylvania, which might be interpreted as establishing legal residency. Litigating the issue might have clarified his legal status and that of other slaveholding federal officials, but it also would have called attention to his slaveholding in the President's House and put him at risk of losing those slaves to manumission. It was thought that he followed Randolph's advice and knowingly and repeatedly violated the state's 1788 Amendment by rotating the enslaved Africans in his presidential household into and out of Pennsylvania. 

There is no record of Washington being challenged. According to Lear, the Pennsylvania Abolition Society seems to have turned a blind eye to the President's actions:

That the Society in this city for the abolition of slavery, had determined to give no advice and take no measures for liberating those Slaves which belonged to the Officers of the general Government or members of Congress. But notwithstanding this, there were not wanting persons who would not only give them (the Slaves) advise , but would use all means to entice them from their masters.

Federal officials
Other slaveholding officers of the executive and judicial branches faced a similar dilemma. Secretary of State Thomas Jefferson swore that he would eventually free his enslaved cook, James Hemings, if Hemings would agree not take advantage of Pennsylvania's abolition law.

Philadelphia's hostile environment for slaveholders was one of the reasons that the Constitution was written to give Congress exclusive control "over such District... as may... become the seat of the government of the United States".

Aftermath
Those enslaved in Pennsylvania before its 1780 Act became law continued to be lifelong slaves, unless manumitted. Also, the 1780 Act and its 1788 Amendment did not apply to fugitive slaves from other states or their children. Pennsylvania tried to extend rights to fugitive slaves through an 1826 personal liberty law, but it and the 1788 Amendment were ruled unconstitutional by the US Supreme Court in Prigg v. Pennsylvania (1842).

Although slavery steadily declined in Pennsylvania, the state that had initially led the way toward abolition tolerated it for decades after it ended in Massachusetts. The 1840 U.S. Census listed 47,854 (99.87%) of the state's blacks as free, and 64 (0.13%) as slaves.

Other states

1777: The Constitution of Vermont bans slavery.
1783: Massachusetts Supreme Court rules slavery illegal based on the 1780 Constitution of Massachusetts. Slavery ended in Massachusetts by the time of the census in 1790.
Maine was part of Massachusetts in 1783 and entered the Union as a free state in 1820. 
1783: New Hampshire Constitution contains a bill of rights that is interpreted as ending slavery. In 1857, a law was approved that formally prohibited slavery.
1784: Connecticut begins a gradual abolition of slavery. A law was approved in 1848 that freed any remaining slaves.
1784: Rhode Island begins a gradual abolition of slavery.
1791: Vermont enters the Union as a free state.
1799: New York State begins a gradual abolition of slavery. A law was approved in 1817 that freed all remaining slaves on July 4, 1827.
1804: New Jersey begins a gradual abolition of slavery.

New Jersey's gradual abolition law freed future children at birth, but male children of enslaved women could be held until age twenty-five and females until age twenty-one. Those enslaved before passage of the 1804 law remained enslaved for life. The last vestiges of slavery remained in New Jersey until December 6, 1865, when ratification of the Thirteenth Amendment to the United States Constitution ended slavery in the United States. New Jersey's legislature did not approve the Thirteenth Amendment until February 1866, two months after it had been ratified by three-fourths of the states.

See also
History of slavery in Pennsylvania
Abolition of slavery timeline

External links

References

Abolitionism in the United States
African-American history of Pennsylvania
African-American documents
Legal history of Pennsylvania
United States slavery law
1780 in law
1780 in Pennsylvania